Carlos Alfredo Oyaneder González (born 7 July 1990) is a Chilean professional footballer who plays as a forward for Deportivo La Higuera.

Club career
Born in Cabildo, Chile, as a child, Oyaneder was with club Bellavista and represented the Cabildo youth team at both national and international tournaments. After a stint with the Huachipato youth system, he joined AGC Cabildo in the Tercera A in 2009. Next, he played for San Antonio Unido (2010) in the same division and Deportivo La Higuera (2011).

In 2011, he moved to Indonesia and played for PSSB Bireuen, where he came thanks to the Chilean coach Simón Elissetche. He returned to Chile in second half 2012 and played for club Dínamo from Quillota.

In 2013, he joined San Luis de Quillota, with whom he won the 2013 Apertura and the 2014–15 season of the Primera B de Chile.

From 2015 to 2018 he played for Cobresal, with whom he got promotion to the top level in 2018.

In 2019, he played for Deportes Santa Cruz.

In 2022, he played for Deportivo La Higuera, making appearances in the 2022 Copa Chile.

International career
Oyaneder represented Chile at under-17 level in the 2007 South American Championship, where he made appearances against Bolivia, Ecuador and Peru. Previously, he made an appearance in a friendly against Uruguay, where he scored a goal.

Honours
San Luis
 Primera B de Chile (2): 2013 Apertura, 2014–15

References

External links
 
 

1990 births
Living people
People from Petorca Province
Chilean footballers
Chilean expatriate footballers
Chile youth international footballers
San Antonio Unido footballers
PSSB Bireuen players
San Luis de Quillota footballers
Cobresal footballers
Deportes Santa Cruz footballers
Tercera División de Chile players
Indonesian Premier Division players
Primera B de Chile players
Chilean Primera División players
Chilean expatriate sportspeople in Indonesia
Expatriate footballers in Indonesia
Association football forwards